Michael Brainard (born November 23, 1965, in Hollywood, California, United States) is an American actor most notable for his role as the second Ted Capwell on NBC's soap opera Santa Barbara. He portrayed the role from 1991 to 1993. He also portrayed Jake Martin on an ABC soap, All My Children, from 1988 to 1991 and 1994 to 1995, prior to joining Santa Barbara.

Filmography

Film

Television

References

External links
 

American male soap opera actors
Living people
1965 births
Male actors from Hollywood, Los Angeles